Haan-Gruiten station (Gruiten until 9 December 2017) is one of the two stations of the Bergian city of Haan in the German state of North Rhine-Westphalia. It is described in German as a Berührungsbahnhof (contact station), as the Düsseldorf–Elberfeld and the Gruiten–Köln-Deutz lines both pass through the station, but their operations are separate. East of the station, they join to form a common route at Linden junction, which is the actual beginning of the Gruiten–Köln-Deutz line. West of the platforms the lines separate to run to the west and the south.

History 

The railway station on the Düsseldorf-Elberfeld line was opened on 3 September 1841 under the name of Haan (Gruiten) and for many years it was the only Haan station. The line to Cologne was opened in 1867 and the current Haan station was opened in 1907, allowing the station in the then independent town of Gruiten to be renamed Gruiten station. In 1909 the existing station building was built. As part of the establishment of S-Bahn services on the Düsseldorf–Wuppertal line in 1988, Gruiten station was significantly rebuilt. The platform on track 1 and the ramps for loading limestone were demolished. This allowed a large park and ride lot to be built. Tracks 2 and 3 were moved and now serve as the S-Bahn station. Track 4 is used as a platform for overtaking trains on the route to and from Cologne. The normal platform for trains to and from Cologne is served by tracks 5 and 6. Track 7 is used by freight trains.

Current operations  

The station is served by Rhine-Ruhr S-Bahn lines, the S 8 every 20 minutes, several S 68 services in the peak hour and every half hour by the Rhein-Wupper-Bahn (RB 48).

The station building was thoroughly renovated in the 1990s. Today the building contains a restaurant and the Gruiten municipal library. On the forecourt of the station there is a taxi rank and bus stop, served by buses towards Mettmann, Haan and Wülfrath.

References

External links

Railway stations in North Rhine-Westphalia
Railway stations in Germany opened in 1841
1841 establishments in Prussia
Rhine-Ruhr S-Bahn stations
S8 (Rhine-Ruhr S-Bahn)
Buildings and structures in Mettmann (district)